Canada participated in the 2015 Parapan American Games.

Competitors
The following table lists Canada's delegation per sport and gender.

Medalists

Archery

Alec Denys
Kevin Evans
Robert Hudson
Karen Van Nest

Athletics

Ben Brown
Jennifer Brown
Josh Cassidy
Mitchell Chase
Isaiah Christophe
Earle Connor
Braedon Dolfo
Jason Dunkerley
Alexandre Dupont
Ilana Dupont
Josh Farrell
Renee Foessel
Jessica Frotten
Holden Gill
Brent Lakatos
Pamela LeJean
Jean-Philippe Maranda
Alister McQueen
Vanessa Murby
Guillaume Ouellet
Kyle Pettey
George Quarcoo
Becky Richter
Jason Roberts
Leah Robinson
Diane Roy
Cody Salomons
Tristan Smyth
Basile Soulama
Michelle Stilwell
Kevin Strybosch
Kenneth Trudgeon
Wes Vick
Dustin Walsh
Kyle Whitehouse
Adam Johnson (Guide)
Joshua Karanja (Guide)
Dylan Williamson (Guide)

Boccia

Eric Bussiere
Marco Dispaltro
Adam Dukovich
Bruno Garneau
Paul Gauthier
Chris Halpen
Alison Levine
Hanif Mawji
Tammy McLeod
Caroline Vietnieks
Ginette Beliveau (Guide)
Kelly Halpen (Guide)
Francine Hébert (Guide)
Hussein Mawji (Guide)
Shiela Soroten (Guide)

Cycling

Daniel Chalifour
Nicole Clermont
Louis-Albert Corriveau-Jolin
Marie-Eve Croteau
Shelley Gautier
Robert Labbe
Mark Ledo
Marie-Claude Molnar
Charles Moreau
Shawna Ryan
Michael Sametz
Robbi Weldon
Ross Wilson
Joanie Caron (Guide)
Alexandre Cloutier (Guide)
Audrey Lemieux (Guide)

Football 7-a-side

Matthew Brown
Lucas Bruno
Sam Charron
Matt Gilbert
Nicholas Heffernan
Dustin Hodgson
Cory Johnson
Kyle Payne
John Phillips
Vito Proietti
Joseph Resendes
Liam Stanley
Trevor Stiles
Damien Wojtiw

Goalball

Men
Brendan Gaulin
Aron Ghebreyohannes
Bruno Hache
Blair Nesbitt
Simon Richard
Ahmad Zeividavi

Women
Ashlie Andrews
Whitney Bogart
Tiana Knight
Jillian MacSween
Nancy Morin
Cassandra Orgeles

Judo

Priscilla Gagné
Justin Karn
Alexander Radoman
Tony Walby

Powerlifting

Men

Sitting volleyball

Men
Jamoi Anderson
Jesse Buckingham
Raymond Gauthier
Austin Hinchey
Douglas Learoyd
David Marchand
Larry Matthews
Jason Naval
José Rebelo
Andrew Tucker
Jesse Ward

Women
Chantal Beauchesne
Angelena Dolezar
Anne Fergusson
Shacarra Orr
Heidi Peters
Tessa Popoff
Amber Skyrpan
Jolan Wong
Katelyn Wright

Swimming

Camille Berube
Morgan Bird
Dalton Boon
Isaac Bouckley
Nathan Clement
Andrew Cooke
Tammy Cunnington
Christian Daniel
Jonathan Dieleman
Valerie Drapeau
Sabrina Duchesne
Alexander Elliot
Sarah Girard
Devin Gotell
Benoit Huot
Kirstie Kasko
Nydia Langill
Jean-Michel Lavallière
James Leroux
Sarah Mailhot
Zachary McAllister
Riley McLean
Sarah Mehain
Gordie Michie
Justine Morrier
Tyler Mrak
Danial Murphy
Scott Patterson
Adam Purdy
Adam Rahier
Aurelie Rivard
Maxime Rousselle
Tess Routliffe
Katarina Roxon
Samantha Ryan
Christopher Sergeant-Tsonos
Nathan Stein
Abi Tripp
Nicolas Turbide
Zachary Zona

Table tennis

Curtis Caron
Stephanie Chan
Mikhail Drozdowski
Steven Dunn
Ian Kent
Masoud Mojtahed
Muhammad Mudassar
Asad Murtaza
Martin Pelletier
Asad Syed

Wheelchair basketball

Men
Vincent Dallaire
Abdi Dini
David Eng
Nikola Goncin
Deion Green
Bo Hedges
Liam Hickey
Chad Jassman
Adam Lancia
Tyler Miller
Jonathan Vermette
Peter Won

Women
Elaine Allard
Tracey Ferguson
Erica Gavel
Katie Harnock
Melanie Hawtin
Maude Jacques
Jamey Jewells
Rosalie Lalonde
Janet McLachlan
Cindy Ouellet
Darda Sales
Arinn Young

Wheelchair rugby

Miranda Biletski
Cody Caldwell
Jason Crone
Patrice Dagenais
Byron Green
Trevor Hirschfield
Fabien Lavoie
Zach Madell
Travis Murao
Patrice Simard
Michael Whitehead
David Willsie

Wheelchair tennis

Philippe Bedard
Yuka Chokyu
Joel Dembe
Mika Ishikawa

See also
Canada at the 2016 Summer Paralympics
Canada at the 2015 Pan American Games

References

2015 in Canadian sports
Nations at the 2015 Parapan American Games
Canada at the Pan American Games